Karel Zeman (born 28 February 1977) is an Italian football coach and the son of Czech-born manager Zdeněk Zeman, currently in charge of Serie D club Lavello.

Career
Zeman took over at Serie D club Bojano in November 2007, at the age of 30. He resigned in March 2008 due to negative results, after achieving only 12 points in 17 games in charge.

In June 2009 he took over at Eccellenza amateurs Toma Maglie from Apulia. He was then dismissed in November 2009 only to be recalled in January 2010.

In August 2010 he moved to another Eccellenza Puglia club, Manfredonia, only to be sacked later on October.

In March 2012 he took over at Fano on what was his first role as head coach of a professional club. After guiding the team to safety and being confirmed for one more season, he was however removed from his managerial duties just after the very first game of the season, a 0–6 home loss to Alessandria.

In January 2014 he took over at the helm of Maltese Premier League club Qormi. After keeping the club in the Maltese top flight, he left to accept an offer from Serie D club Selargius; he resigned in May 2015, with the team deep in relegation trouble.

In December 2015, Zeman went back into management at the helm of another Serie D club, Abano. After a good season with Abano, he was offered the head coaching role of fallen giants Reggina; the club, originally scheduled to play in the Serie D, was successively readmitted to Lega Pro to fill a vacancy. He guided them to a safe season and to avoid relegation, and left the club by the end of the season.

He returned into management on 27 March 2018, as new head coach of relegation-battling Serie C club Santarcangelo until the end of the season. He left the club by the end of the season after succumbing to Vicenza in the relegation playoffs.

In July 2018 he returned to his native Sicily, accepting a head coach role at Serie D club Gela. He resigned from his post on 7 December 2018, mentioning  issues at the club level and the inagibility of the local football stadium since the beginning of the season as the reasons for his decision.

In November 2019, Zeman went back into management at the helm of another Sicilian Serie D club, ACR Messina. He resigned on 12 February 2020 due to disagreements with the board.

In July 2020, he took over the reins of newly promoted Serie D club Lavello. After guiding Lavello to sixth place in the league, Zeman left Lavello by the end of the season. On 11 November 2021, he was rehired as head coach of Lavello.

Style of management
Akin to his father Zdenek Zeman's coaching style and attacking football tactics, he is a supporter of the 4–3–3 formation.

References

External links

1977 births
Living people
Italian people of Czech descent
Italian football managers
Italian expatriate football managers
Serie C managers